The 1987 Winston Western 500 was a NASCAR Winston Cup Series race that was held on November 8, 1987, at Riverside International Raceway in Riverside, California.

Rick Hendrick, Irv Hoerr and Tommy Kendall would make their respective debuts in the NASCAR Cup Series while George Follmer, Harry Goularte, Jim Robinson and Glen Steurer would leave the NASCAR Cup Series after this event. This race would turn out to be the final fall race in Riverside history; it eventually closed on July 2, 1989, after the 1988 Budweiser 400.

Bob Howard also entered (and at least practiced) his #89 Pennzoil Oldsmobile for this race. However, he had to withdraw from qualifying for this event due to personal reasons. Commercialism had come into the fold during the late-1980s in NASCAR as 11 of the cars on the racing grid were sponsored by recognized national products like Levi Garrett, Coors, Folgers, SKOAL, and Coors.

Race report
Approximately 18% of this event was held under a caution flag; with each green flag stretch lasting about 20 laps on average. 42 drivers would qualify for this 119-lap event. Drivers who failed to qualify were St. James Davis, Trevor Boys, Reno Fontana, Jack Sellers, John Krebs, Bob Howard and Brad Noffsinger.

Geoffrey Bodine and Cup series champion Dale Earnhardt had an epic, door banging battle for the lead throughout the middle stages of this race. The titanic battle of yellow Chevrolets was the highlight of the race but both drivers would pay the price for it, Earnhardt used up his car blew the #3's motor, he had already locked up the series title one race earlier at Rockingham and had decided to go for broke in this one with nothing to lose. Bodine's #5 Monte Carlo was the fastest car on track after that but he would then blow a tire in the closing laps and went screaming off the track into a large mud puddle at Turn 1 as a result. Bodine's hopes of victory were dashed but he limped back to the pits and salvaged a top-10. Notable crew chiefs that fully participated in this race included Joey Arrington, Andy Petree, Dale Inman, Harry Hyde, Larry McReynolds, Jeff Hammond, Bud Moore and Kirk Shelmerdine.

Rusty Wallace inherited the lead and drove to victory, Benny Parsons and Kyle Petty were too busy racing each other for second place to make a serious run at Wallace for the victory. Benny Parsons would make his 199th and final top-5 finish at this event. The performance that Wallace did with his Pontiac was very good compared to the rest of the Pontiac drivers who were very weak in comparison to Wallace. This would, unfortunately, mark the final win for the Pontiac 2+2. Only Rusty Wallace was able to win races with that model vehicle, and all of them were either on short tracks or road courses. Ironically, the Pontiac 2+2 was designed to be better aerodynamically at superspeedways such as Talladega and Daytona.

Ken Schrader had a rough Cup weekend; he qualified near the back and failed to finish with an engine failure in his penultimate outing in Junie Donlavey's #90 Ford. 

This race included a very rare instance of Elmo Langley campaigning a non-Ford product since the late-1950s.

He would never finish in the "top five" in a NASCAR Cup Series event after this one. Four yellow flags slowed the race for 21 laps while no red flags were given out. Jack Sellers' qualifying speed of  made him the slowest driver not to qualify for the race. The owner of Hendrick Motorsports would bring home for his team a lowly 33rd-place finish after qualifying in a half-decent 21st place. The first caution for this event came when Hershel McGriff is given a hard bump by Morgan Shepherd right after his engine blew; resulting in his unfortunate last-place finish. While Geoffrey Bodine, George Follmer and Darrell Waltrip dominated the early stretch of the race, the later portions of the race were dominated by Geoffrey Bodine, Dale Earnhardt and Rusty Wallace.

Roy Smith would be the only foreigner to qualify for this event; he was from Canada. Vehicles from Chevrolet and Ford were primarily the vehicles that raced in this event. Jimmy Means would become the lowest-place finisher to actually complete the race. Individual race winnings for each driver varied from the winner's portion of $47,725 ($ when adjusted for inflation) to the last-place finisher's portion of $2,525 ($ when adjusted for inflation); although three drivers (who finished ahead of last place) were only awarded triple-digit prize winnings. NASCAR officials authorized a grand total of $307,325 to be given out to all the qualifying drivers in this racing event ($ when adjusted for inflation).

During the 1987 NASCAR Winston Cup Series season, there were three road course races on a schedule of 29 races, the last time three road courses would be on the schedule for the Cup series until 2018.  In recent years, the second-tier Xfinity Series has run three road courses but will run four in 2018.

After the conclusion of this racing event, NASCAR would never award less than $1,000 USD to any driver ever again ($ when adjusted for inflation). Mark Martin would eventually return to the NASCAR Winston Cup Series for the 1988 season; racing for the legendary Jack Roush and carrying the #6 that would make him popular throughout the rest of the 1980s.

Qualifying

Top 20 finishers

Timeline
Section reference: 
 Start of race: Geoffrey Bodine had the pole position to begin the race.
 Lap 8: Hershel McGriff blew his engine while racing at high speeds.
 Lap 9: George Follmer took over the lead from Geoffrey Bodine.
 Lap 17: Darrell Waltrip took over the lead from George Follmer.
 Lap 18: Ricky Rudd took over the lead from Darrell Waltrip.
 Lap 19: Glen Steuer managed to wreck his vehicle's suspension.
 Lap 22: Geoffrey Bodine took over the lead from Ricky Rudd.
 Lap 23: Roy Smith managed to overheat his vehicle.
 Lap 24: Ruben Garcia blew his engine while racing at high speeds.
 Lap 36: Bill Schmidt managed to wreck his vehicle's clutch.
 Lap 39: Ricky Rudd took over the lead from Geoffrey Bodine.
 Lap 40: Terry Labonte took over the lead from Ricky Rudd.
 Lap 41: Geoffrey Bodine took over the lead from Terry Labonte.
 Lap 52: Caution given out by NASCAR officials, ended on lap 54.
 Lap 62: Bobby Hillin, Jr. blew his engine while racing at high speeds.
 Lap 73: Dale Earnhardt took over the lead from Geoffrey Bodine.
 Lap 74: Geoffrey Bodine took over the lead from Dale Earnhardt.
 Lap 75: Rick Hendrick managed to ruin his vehicle's transmission.
 Lap 79: Harry Goularte managed to wreck his vehicle's suspension.
 Lap 91: Ricky Rudd blew his engine while racing at high speeds.
 Lap 93: Dale Earnhardt blew his engine while racing at high speeds.
 Lap 106: Harry Gant blew his engine while racing at high speeds.
 Lap 109: Rusty Wallace took over the lead from Geoffrey Bodine.
 Finish: Rusty Wallace was officially declared the winner of the event.

Standings after the race

References

Winston Western
Winston Western 500
NASCAR races at Riverside International Raceway